Paulo Renato Valério Calado Rodrigues (born 14 May 1987), known as Renato, is a Portuguese former professional footballer who played as a central defender.

Club career
Born in Alcácer do Sal, Renato was promoted from Sporting CP's famed youth academy in 2007–08, after having spent his first senior year at lowly Real S.C. on loan. At the end of the season he was loaned again, to Segunda Liga side S.C. Olhanense, returning to Sporting in June 2009.

In the summer of 2009 yet another loan for Renato befell, now to C.F. Estrela da Amadora; the Lisbon-based club had just finished in midtable in the Primeira Liga, but was relegated to the third division due to irregularities. He subsequently returned to Olhanense, with the Algarve team now in the top flight.

From 2010 to 2015, Renato alternated between the second and third tiers, representing no fewer than six clubs. On 26 February 2015 he moved abroad for the first time, signing with Major League Soccer side San Jose Earthquakes. He made his debut in top-division football on 7 March at the age of 27, featuring 90 minutes in a 1–0 away loss against FC Dallas.

International career
Renato participated in the 2007 FIFA U-20 World Cup, playing all the matches and minutes as Portugal exited in the round of 16.

References

External links

1987 births
Living people
Sportspeople from Setúbal District
Portuguese footballers
Association football defenders
Liga Portugal 2 players
Segunda Divisão players
Sporting CP footballers
Real S.C. players
S.C. Olhanense players
C.F. Estrela da Amadora players
C.D. Mafra players
C.D. Trofense players
Atlético Clube de Portugal players
AD Oliveirense players
C.D.R. Quarteirense players
CD Operário players
Major League Soccer players
San Jose Earthquakes players
Portugal youth international footballers
Portugal under-21 international footballers
Portuguese expatriate footballers
Expatriate soccer players in the United States
Portuguese expatriate sportspeople in the United States